Kwun Yam Beach, also known as Afternoon Beach, is a gazetted beach facing Kwun Yam Wan on the east coast of Cheung Chau, Hong Kong. The beach is managed by the Leisure and Cultural Services Department of the Hong Kong Government. The beach is 100 metres long and is rated as Grade 1 by the Environmental Protection Department for its water quality. It is one of the two gazetted beaches in Cheung Chau along with Cheung Chau Tung Wan Beach. This beach is smaller than Cheung Chau Tung Wan Beach.

Name
The name Kwun Yam refers to the bodhisattva Avalokiteśvara.

History
The beach was gazetted by the Hong Kong Government and opened in 1971.

On 8 January 2017, a body of a 52-year-old angler was found at the beach more than a day after he was reported missing.

Usage
The beach is a beautiful fine white beach situated on the east coast of Cheung Chau. Since the 1996 Summer Olympics, Kwun Yam Wan had become a tourist spot for local visitors as well as being the home base for Hong Kong's first Olympic gold medallist, windsurfer Lee Lai-shan.

Features
The beach has the following features:
 Changing rooms
 Showers
 Toilets
 Water sports centre
 Light refreshment kiosk

See also
 Beaches of Hong Kong

References

External links 

 Official website

Cheung Chau
Beaches of Hong Kong